The 2003 UEFA Futsal Championship was the fourth official edition of the UEFA-governed European Championship for national futsal teams. It was held in Italy, between 17 February and 24 February 2003, in two venues located in Aversa & Caserta.

Qualification

Qualified teams

Venues

Squads

Final tournament

Group A

Group B

Knockout stage

Semi-finals

Final

External links
 UEFA.com

 
2003
Futsal
UEFA
2003
Caserta
Aversa
UEFA Futsal Championship